Speudotettix is a genus of true bugs belonging to the family Cicadellidae.

The species of this genus are found in Europe.

Species:
 Speudotettix minor Emeljanov, 1962
 Speudotettix montanus Gebicki & Szwedo, 1991

References

Cicadellidae
Hemiptera genera